Vincent Enyeama  (born 29 August 1982) is a Nigerian former professional footballer who played as a goalkeeper. 
Despite his below-average height for a goalkeeper, he is popularly regarded as one of the greatest African goalkeepers of all time and of his era.

During his senior career, which spanned nearly 20 years, Enyeama played for Ibom Stars, Enyimba, Iwuanyanwu Nationale, Bnei Yehuda, Hapoel Tel Aviv, Lille and Maccabi Tel Aviv. He was also a member of the Nigeria national team from 2002 until October 2015, serving as its captain from 2013 until his retirement from international football in 2015. With 101 caps, he was Nigeria's most capped player until November 2021 when he was surpassed by Ahmed Musa.

Club career

Enyimba International
During his spell with Enyimba International F.C., he won the CAF Champions League twice, with one noteworthy distinction: He was always substituted before penalty shootouts. "I don't know why I was substituted before penalties, but it worked," he said in an interview in 2006. "In Israel I stopped many penalties and now everyone knows that I can handle penalties."

Bnei Yehuda
After three seasons with Enyimba International F.C. and one with Iwuanyanwu Nationale (now known as Heartland F.C.), Enyeama moved to small Israeli club Bnei Yehuda Tel Aviv. In his first season, the team qualified for the final of the Israel State Cup and, having finished fourth in the Israeli Premier League, for the 2006 UEFA Cup competition as well.

Hapoel Tel Aviv
Enyeama signed for Hapoel Tel Aviv in 2007. Hapoel endured a poor season in 2007/2008, but Enyeama helped the team avoid relegation and reach the state cup final.

During the 2008–09 season, Enyeama became Hapoel's penalty kicker, won the "Player of The Year" award, and just missed out on leading Hapoel to the league title.

In the 2009–10 season, Hapoel won the league and cup double, with Enyeama featuring prominently. He scored a goal in the Cup Final, but missed a penalty in the last fixture of the year, which Hapoel eventually won by scoring in the 92nd minute, thereby capturing the league title.

On 18 August 2010, he scored his first goal of the 2010–11 season with a penalty against Red Bull Salzburg in the Champions League qualifiers.

Enyeama played well on the Champions League Group Stage, especially against Lyon and Schalke 04. Hapoel also won the Israeli cup again.

Lille
In June 2011 Enyeama moved to French side Lille for an undisclosed fee on a three-year contract. He made his debut on 18 October 2011 against Inter Milan in the 2012 UEFA Champions League group stage, where Inter managed a 1–0 victory.

In August 2012 Enyeama agreed a one-year loan deal with Maccabi Tel Aviv and was presented to the media by Maccabi's Sports Director Jordi Cruyff on 8 August 2012. He appeared in 27 Israeli Premier League fixtures and Maccabi went on to win the championship title.

During the 2013–14 Ligue 1 season, club manager René Girard picked Enyeama as his first-choice goalkeeper ahead of Steeve Elana, who had previously been the first-choice goalkeeper under Rudi Garcia. With the help of his two centre-backs, Marko Baša and Simon Kjær, Enyeama kept 11 consecutive clean sheets in Ligue 1 matches during the first half of the season. On 8 December 2013, Enyeama finally conceded a goal after playing 1,062 minutes of Ligue 1 football in an away match against Bordeaux, during which he was beaten by Landry N'Guémo's deflected strike in the 27th minute. He thus came within 114 minutes of equalling Gaëtan Huard's Ligue 1 goalkeeping record, set in 1993, of playing 1,176 minutes without conceding a goal. 

In the 2017–18 season Enyeama did not make a league appearance having been left out of the first team due to "a disagreement between the player and the club's management". He joined the first team's pre-season training in July 2018.

He was released by mutual consent on 31 August 2018. In January 2019 he said he was keen to play again, and in July 2019 he went on trial with French club Dijon. Despite not being offered a contract by Dijon he expressed gratitude to the club. While at the start of the 2019–20 season Enyeama stated that he hoped to find a new club and continue playing, he finally retired after the end of the campaign.

International career
After making his debut for the Nigeria national football team against Kenya in May 2002, Enyeama was selected for the 2002 FIFA World Cup as a cover for Ike Shorunmu. He made his competitive debut in that tournament, keeping a clean sheet against England in the third group match. Since the retirement of Shorunmu, he has been the first-choice goalkeeper for the national team, helping the Super Eagles to third-place finishes in the 2004, 2006, 2010 Africa Cup of Nations tournaments, and captaining the team to victory of in the 2013 edition. He has also participated in the 2010 and 2014 FIFA World Cups, and the 2013 FIFA Confederations Cup.

In the 2006 Africa Cup of Nations, Enyeama stopped three kicks in the quarter-final penalty shootout against Tunisia, but could not prevent a loss to Ivory Coast in the semi-final. In the 2010 tournament, he was again Nigeria's shootout hero at the quarter-final stage, saving from Zambia's Thomas Nyrienda and scoring the winning kick himself.

Enyeama made his second FIFA World Cup appearance in the 2010 tournament in South Africa. He was named man of the match in Nigeria's first game of the tournament, a defiant display that restricted Argentina to a 1–0 win. Enyeama, who was playing his 56th international for the Super Eagles, made six fine saves against the two-time world champions, four of them from Lionel Messi. Argentine coach Diego Maradona praised him as the reason Messi was not able to score a goal. Enyeama was also awarded man of the match in the team's next fixture, a 2–1 loss to Greece, but was at fault for Vasilis Torosidis' winning goal.

At the 2013 Africa Cup of Nations, Enyeama deputised for regular captain Joseph Yobo, who stayed on the bench for most of the competition. On 10 February, Enyeama led Nigeria to its third continental victory, keeping a clean sheet in a 1–0 defeat of Burkina Faso in the 2013 Africa Cup of Nations Final. He was named to the team of the tournament as first choice goalkeeper, conceding only four goals in six matches.

In June 2014, Enyeama was named in Nigeria's squad for the 2014 FIFA World Cup. In the Super Eagles' first fixture, he kept the second FIFA World Cup clean sheet of his career as Nigeria drew 0–0 with Iran. He subsequently recorded a second consecutive shutout in the fixture against Bosnia and Herzegovina, a 1–0 win which gave Nigeria its first win at the tournament since the 1998 edition. He conceded three goals in the last match of the first round against Argentina, a game which ended in a 3–2 defeat for Nigeria, placing them second in the group and thus qualifying them for the second round for the first time in 16 years.

On 26 March 2015, Enyeama won his 100th cap for Nigeria in a 1–0 loss to Uganda. He retired from international football on 8 October 2015.

Personal life
A Christian from Ika Local Government Area of Akwa Ibom State, Enyeama is married and a father of three. In 2004, he was involved in a car accident in Uyo, Akwa Ibom State southern Nigeria, in which two motorcycle passengers were killed. The driver of the car in which Enyeama was travelling was left in critical condition. Despite the severity of the accident, Enyeama suffered only bruises after the car somersaulted twice as it swerved to avoid the motorbike.

Honours
Enyimba
 Nigerian Premier League: 2001, 2002, 2003
 CAF Champions League: 2003, 2004

Hapoel Tel-Aviv
 Israeli Premier League: 2009–10
 Israel State Cup: 2009–10, 2010–11

Maccabi Tel-Aviv
 Israeli Premier League: 2012–13
Nigeria
 Africa Cup of Nations: 2013
Individual
 CAF Champions League Player of the Year: 2003, 2004
 Footballer of the Year in Israel: 2009
 UNFP Player of the Month: October 2013, November 2013
 Prix Marc-Vivien Foé: 2014
 Africa Cup of Nations Team of the Tournament: 2004, 2013
 Goalkeeper of the year Nigeria Pitch Awards: 2013, 2014
 King of the pitch Nigeria Pitch Awards: 2014
 Goal Nigeria Player of the Year: 2014
 IFFHS CAF Men's Team of the Decade 2011–2020
 IFFHS Greatest African Goalkeeper of all Time.

See also

 List of men's footballers with 100 or more international caps

References

External links

 

1982 births
Living people
Nigerian Christians
Sportspeople from Kaduna
Nigerian footballers
Association football goalkeepers
Nigeria international footballers
Africa Cup of Nations-winning players
2002 FIFA World Cup players
2004 African Cup of Nations players
2006 Africa Cup of Nations players
2008 Africa Cup of Nations players
2010 Africa Cup of Nations players
2010 FIFA World Cup players
2013 Africa Cup of Nations players
2013 FIFA Confederations Cup players
2014 FIFA World Cup players
Israeli Premier League players
Ligue 1 players
Enyimba F.C. players
Heartland F.C. players
Bnei Yehuda Tel Aviv F.C. players
Hapoel Tel Aviv F.C. players
Maccabi Tel Aviv F.C. players
Lille OSC players
FIFA Century Club
Nigerian expatriate footballers
Nigerian expatriate sportspeople in Israel
Expatriate footballers in Israel
Nigerian expatriate sportspeople in France
Expatriate footballers in France
Israeli Footballer of the Year recipients